This article contains the list of the past, present and forthcoming Ghazal singers that are based in Pakistan.
Following are the most popular Pakistani Ghazal singers of all times.

For more Ghazal singers by their letter specifications you can find it below.

A
 Ahmed Rushdi
 A Nayyar
 Abida Parveen
 Amanat Ali Khan
 Asad Amanat Ali Khan
 Attaullah Khan Essa Khailwi
 Amjad Parvez

B
 Begum Akhtar
 Bacha Zareen

F
 Farida Khanum

G
 Ghulam Ali
 Ghulam Abbas

H
 Habib Wali Mohammad
 Hamid Ali Khan

I
 Iqbal Bano

K
 Khalil Haider

M
 Malika Pukhraj
 Mehdi Hassan
 Munni Begum

N
 Nayyara Noor
 Noor Jehan
 Nusrat Fateh Ali Khan

S
 Sajjad Ali
 Shafqat Amanat Ali
 Shafqat Ali Khan
 Shoukat Ali Khan

T
 Tahira Syed
 Tina Sani

See also 
 Music of South Asia
 Music of Pakistan
 Culture of Pakistan
 List of Pakistani musicians
 List of Pakistanis

References

Ghazal Singers
List